The men's discus throw event at the 2003 European Athletics U23 Championships was held in Bydgoszcz, Poland, at Zawisza Stadion on 17 and 19 July.

Medalists

Results

Final
19 July

Qualifications
17 July
Qualifying 57.60 or 12 best to the Final

Group A

Group B

Participation
According to an unofficial count, 30 athletes from 23 countries participated in the event.

 (1)
 (1)
 (1)
 (2)
 (1)
 (3)
 (2)
 (1)
 (1)
 (2)
 (1)
 (1)
 (1)
 (1)
 (2)
 (1)
 (1)
 (1)
 (2)
 (1)
 (1)
 (1)
 (1)

References

Discus throw
Discus throw at the European Athletics U23 Championships